Målfrid Floan Belbo (born 4 November 1927) is a Norwegian politician for the Centre Party.

She served as a deputy representative to the Parliament of Norway from Nord-Trøndelag during the terms 1969–1973 and 1973–1977. She met during 23 days of parliamentary session.

References

1927 births
Living people
People from Snåsa
Deputy members of the Storting
Centre Party (Norway) politicians
Politicians from Nord-Trøndelag
Women members of the Storting
Place of birth missing (living people)